Madrasa El Kacemia is one of the madrasahs of the medina of Tunis, which was constructed during the reign of the Husainid Dynasty.

Etymology 
The madrasa's name is derived from its owner, the saint Al Haj Kacem Ibn Al Haj Ali Ben Youssef Al Jerbi, a Sheikh who died in 1936 (1355 Hijri).

Location 
The madrasa is located at the Sidi Sridek mausoleum.

History 
It was inaugurated in 1928 (1347 Hijri) by Muhammad VI al-Habib, who granted Al-Haj Kacem the Order of Glory in appreciation for the construction of this madrasa.

Description 
The madrasa includes a student housing and a Quranic elementary school (kouttab) for children.

Bibliography

References 

Kacemia